Santa Barbara Senior High School, "Home of the Dons," is situated on a sprawling  campus in Santa Barbara, California in the Santa Barbara Unified School District. Among the oldest high schools in California and one of five high schools in the District, Santa Barbara High School was established in 1875 at the corner of Anapamu and De La Vina, but relocated to its present Upper Eastside site in 1924. Today, Santa Barbara High School has a diverse, near 65% minority enrollment of over 2000 pupils, 92 full-time teachers, and small learning academies, including Visual Arts and Design (VADA), Computer Science (CSA), and Multimedia Arts and Design (MAD).  The school also features a performing arts department that employs professional designers, choreographers, musical directors and guest artists. 

Due to a shortfall in state education funding, the school, a California historic landmark, relies on the Foundation for Santa Barbara High School to increase funds for academics, mental health and capital improvements, including renovation of the Peabody Stadium and new fields for track, football, soccer and lacrosse.

History 

In 1916, the Santa Barbara Board of Education, along with students and community leaders, launched a bond campaign to build a new expanded Santa Barbara High School, which was then located at the corner of Anapamu and De la Vina near downtown Santa Barbara. After a series of bond elections, construction started in 1922 to enlarge the school and move it to the Upper Eastside of Santa Barbara, where it is now located at 700 East Anapamu Street. 

The class of 1924 was the first class to graduate from the Anapamu site, despite the fact that the students had not attended class there. On Thanksgiving Day, 1924, Frederick Forrest Peabody donated to the school a new football stadium, which the student body named Peabody Stadium in his honor. In 1925, the first group of seniors to attend classes there received their graduation diplomas.

In November 2005, its 18th-century Spanish influenced design was named an official California and City historic landmark.

Until the establishment of San Marcos High School in 1958 and Dos Pueblos High School in 1966, Santa Barbara High School was the sole public high school to serve the Santa Barbara-Goleta community.

Leadership 
In 2018, Santa Barbara Unified School District tapped Elise Simmons, a former social studies teacher, intervention coach, assistant principal and principal to serve as Principal of Santa Barbara High School. A 19-year veteran of the District, Simmons obtained her bachelor of arts and masters in education from UC Santa Barbara, and a doctorate from Concordia University in Chicago. Upon assuming the role of Principal, Simmons said her priorities would be college and career readiness, athletics, as well as student mental health and wellness.

Demographics 
In 2022, U.S. News & World Report included the following demographic statistics for Santa Barbara High School: 64.7% minority enrollment; 58.9% Hispanic; 35.3% white; 1.7% Asian and 1.1% Black.; 49% economically disadvantaged; 43% free lunch; 6% reduced price lunch.

School academies and special programs

Academies 
The school has three academies: Visual Arts and Design (VADA), Computer Science (CSA), and Multimedia Arts and Design (MAD).

Visual Arts and Design (VADA) 
VADA, a small learning community established in 1999, offers courses in painting, drawing, digital art and photography. 

In 2021, VADA launched a $6.5 million capital campaign to construct a new modern design lab and art studio for students to use laser cutters and 3-D printers. The new VADA center was funded by bond sales, a state grant and private donations.

Computer Science Academy (CSA) 
The Computer Science curriculum offers computational art, software design, mobile programming, robotics and 3-D printing. In 2019, The National Center for Women in Technology awarded their annual Aspirations in Computing Award to SBHS student Ella Onishuk, co-president of the school's Girls Who Code Club, and an Honorable Mention to SBHS student Joy Patterson, vice-president of the Robotics Club. Patterson worked with a team of students to develop an award-winning app with an interactive map of Santa Barbara to boost local tourism following deadly mudslides in 2018.

Multimedia Arts and Design (MAD) 
The MAD academy offers courses in graphic design, web design, advanced film production and advanced photo journalism. The academy also offers an annual service-learning trip to Mexico where students construct homes for families in need of housing.

Performing Arts 
The Santa Barbara High Theater has been in operation continuously for over 100 years. The performing arts department, which partners with the Santa Barbara Theater Foundation, employs professional designers, choreographers, musical directors and guest artists to work with students. Students perform year-round in an 800-seat theater featuring state of the art lighting and sound. Past productions have included The Crucible, Chicago, 'Carrie, and Head Over Heels.

Former student participants in the performing arts program include Dana Costello (Jekyll & Hyde on Broadway), Jessica Adcock Love (Grace on Broadway). SBHS has had two finalists in the Youth Spotlight Awards (Geoffrey Hahn, runner-up, 2012 and Grant Bower, 2014).

 Ethnic Studies 
Community activist Fabiola Gonzalez, a 2009 graduate from Santa Barbara High School, founded the multi-generational Santa Barbara Ethnic Studies Now! Coalition in 2015 to urge the Santa Barbara School Board to make ethnic studies a high school graduation requirement.

In 2018, the Santa Barbara School Board, in an effort to close the achievement gap, voted unanimously to require ethnic studies coursework for high school graduation in 2023--a date later extended to 2024. 

 Mural 

In collaboration with SBHS alumni, including local artist Manuel Unzueta, more than 20 students at Santa Barbara High School painted a 60-foot ethnic mural outside the campus cafeteria. The six-panel mural, titled ‘La Loteria De Vida" (The Life Lottery) features symbols of Chicano and Chumash culture, while paying tribute to history of Santa Barbara and the high school. Hundreds of people turned out for the mural's official unveiling in 2021.  

 Academic performance 
In 2022, U.S. News & World Report ranked Santa Barbara High School 3,566 out of 17,843 schools in the nation; 528 out of 1,603 public high schools ranked in California. With a graduation rate of 91%, a majority students at Santa Barbara High School took at least one Advanced Placement exam, though the passage rate on the AP exam was only 37%. Proficiency scores based on Smarter Balance tests were as follows: 

 37%  Mathematics Proficiency
 62%  Reading Proficiency
 39%  Science Proficiency

In 2010, Newsweek's list of America's Best High Schools included Dos Pueblos, Santa Barbara and San Marcos high schools.

 Athletics 

SBHS offers baseball, softball, basketball, cross country, football, golf, soccer, swimming, tennis, volleyball, water polo, wrestling, frisbee and surfing. Known for its athletic achievements, the Don went to five California Interscholastic Federation (CIF) finals in 2007-2008 and has won 51 titles. In 2014, the girls' basketball team, then coached by Andrew Butcher, won the CIF 3A Southern Section and was runner up for the state championship. 

Launched in decades ago, the SBHS Surf Team features a Surf History Hall of Fame that includes board shaper Jon Pyzel and pros Cole Robbins and Tom Curren. SBHS wood shop students are taught computer programming to cut foam for surfboards and refine the boards with hand planes and rulers.

In 2019, Santa Barbara High’s women’s longboard surf team won the championship for the Coastal High Schools Division at the Scholastic Surf Series High School State Championships held in Oceanside. In 2022, the high school surf club won the division in all categories — men’s shortboard/longboard, women’s shortboard/longboard, and bodyboard. 

 Peabody Stadium renovation 
A $39 million dollar renovation of Peabody Stadium was completed in 2020 with partial funding from the Foundation for Santa Barbara High School. Refurbished Olympic-quality fields adhere to CIF standards, allowing the school to host competitive meets, including track, football, lacrosse and international soccer tournaments with a notably large field. 

 Student newspaper 
The school's newspaper, The Forge, has been in continuous publication since 1914, making it the second-oldest high school newspaper to publish without interruption in California. Among the 2022 features were articles entitled "The Surreal World of Ukrainians in Santa Barbara" and "Why You Should Donate Your Hair to Wigs for Kids."

Former Forge editor Leon Litwack (class of 1947) is a Pulitzer Prize winner, retired UC Berkeley professor and author of books on slavery. Mary Claudia Nettles Madson, a former 1938 SBHS journalism student on The Forge, was among the first female UPI journalists. Manuel Unzueta (1968), a former cartoonist for The Forge, is a well-known Santa Barbara muralist who has painted murals at Bohnett Park and the Eastside Library.

In 2008, The Forge was the target of a break-in, when thieves stole five computers, a printer, and a camera.

 Foundation for Santa Barbara High School 
To address a $3,000 shortfall in state per-pupil funding, the Foundation for Santa Barbara High School, a non-profit 501(c) 3, raises money to support academics, counseling, sports and other programs. During the COVID-19 pandemic, the Foundation paid for outdoor tents and air purifiers for classrooms and the school library, as well as distributed grants to families in need. The Foundation renovated an indoor-outdoor “Solarium” for a teachers' lounge and raised $5 million for the 2,300 seat Peabody Stadium renovation.

Notable alumni
Tanya Atwater, geophysicist, "Mother of Plate Tectonics" (1960)
Dylan Axelrod, professional baseball pitcher for the Chicago White Sox of Major League Baseball
Stephen Benton, pioneer in holographic imaging, and inventor of the rainbow hologram (1959)
Timothy Bottoms, actor (lead, "Johnny Got His Gun), producer (1970)
Josh Brolin, Academy award nominee actor
Booker Brown, NFL football player
Josh Bryant, strength coach 
Daryl Cagle, MSNBC.com's daily editorial cartoonist (1974)
Pearl Chase, pioneer in the fields of conservation, preservation, social services, and civic planning (1903)
Kami Craig, Olympic silver medalist (2008), and gold medalist (2012); water polo (2005)
Randall Cunningham, former NFL Philadelphia Eagles quarterback and All-Pro player (1981)
Sam Cunningham, USC All-American and Player of the Game (1973 Rose Bowl), College Football Hall of Fame 2011; former NFL New England Patriots running back (1969)
Tom Curren, professional surfer (three time world champion), and musician (1982)
Robert Denno, professor, entomology, butterfly ecologist (1945–2008) 
Thomas Dibblee, figure in geological and topographical work in mapping the state of California (1931)
Macduff Everton, American photographer, National Geographic
Don Ford, former NBA Los Angeles Lakers and Cleveland Cavaliers player (1971)
Al Geiberger, professional golfer, record score (59) in a PGA Tour event (1955)
Martha Graham, pioneer of modern dance (1913)
George Greenough,  surfing pioneer (1960)
Taylor Hackford, Academy award-winning filmmaker (1963)
Brad Hall, Saturday Night Live news anchor (early years), creator of TV's The Single Guy, environmental activist (1972)
Diana M. Holland, U.S. Army major general
Gary K. Hart, former California Secretary of Education and state legislator (1961)
Karen Kane, fashion designer (1974)
Ward Kimball, Disney animator, academy award winner for the cartoon It's Tough to be a Bird; creations include Jiminy Cricket, the Mad Hatter, and Pecos Bill (1932)
Karch Kiraly, three-time Olympic gold medalist (indoor 1984, 1988; beach, 1996)  and professional volleyball great (1978)
Bill Leavy, NFL referee Super Bowl XL (1965)
Leon Litwack, Pulitizer Prize winner for History for his book Been in the Storm So Long'' (1947)
Alma Martinez, Olympian for Mexico (2004), women's football (1999)
Eddie Mathews, Baseball Hall of Famer (1949)
Thalia Munro, Olympic bronze medalist (2004), water polo (2000)
John Northrop, aviation (1913)
Charles A. Ott Jr., United States Army Major General and Director of the Army National Guard (1937)
Charles Schwab, founder of the world famous discount brokerage firm and innovative philanthropist (1955)
Ron Shelton, writer/director of film including Bull Durham and White Men Can't Jump (1963)
Chris Shiflett, lead guitarist for the Foo Fighters
Ryan Spilborghs, Major League Baseball outfielder (1998)
John Whittemore, World's Oldest Athlete (1917)
 Jamaal Wilkes, former NBA Los Angeles Lakers and Golden State Warriors player with four NBA Championships (1970)
 Yeti Beats (aka Dave Sprecher), Grammy nominated producer (2000)

Alma mater
The school's alma mater is "Santa Barbara, Hail to Thee!". It was written by Doris Holt, Class of 1944.

References

External links
 Santa Barbara High School 
 Santa Barbara High School Wall of Fame
 Santa Barbara High School Theatre
 The Forge (SBHS student newspaper)
 Santa Barbara Unified School District
 Foundation for Santa Barbara High School
 Ethnic Studies Now Coalition

Buildings and structures in Santa Barbara, California
Educational institutions established in 1875
High schools in Santa Barbara County, California
History of Santa Barbara County, California
Landmarks in California
Public high schools in California
1875 establishments in California